Norman S. Standlee (July 19, 1919 – January 5, 1981) was an American football fullback and, later in his career, linebacker for the San Francisco 49ers of the NFL.  He was drafted out of Stanford University by the Chicago Bears in 1941. He paid immediate dividends by finishing fourth in the league in rushing with a total of 414 yards and second in average per carry with 5.1. He helped the Chicago Bears to the league championship title over the New York Giants that year before serving in the armed forces in World War II.

Standlee was also the first fullback for the San Francisco 49ers of the All-America Football Conference, playing with Frankie Albert, Johnny Strzykalski, and Len Eshmont in that first backfield of the 49ers.

On January 5, 1981, he died of natural causes in a motel room. He was 61.

References

External links

1919 births
1981 deaths
Sportspeople from Downey, California
American football running backs
Stanford Cardinal football players
Chicago Bears players
San Francisco 49ers (AAFC) players
San Francisco 49ers players
Western Conference Pro Bowl players
American military personnel of World War II